The Constellation Program was NASA's planned future human spaceflight program between 2005 and 2009, which aimed to develop a new crewed spacecraft (Orion) and a pair of launchers (Ares I and Ares V) to continue servicing the International Space Station and return to the Moon.

As of 2009, a single uncrewed suborbital launch test (Ares I-X) had been flown, with crewed missions anticipated to begin between 2014 (when an uncrewed mission was indeed launched) and 2017-2019 (according to the independent Augustine Commission). On February 1, 2010, President Obama announced that he intended to cancel the program with the U.S. 2011 fiscal year budget. A revised proposal in April confirmed that the Orion spacecraft would be retained for future missions beyond low Earth orbit, with the Ares launchers redeveloped into the Space Launch System. However, the Constellation Program itself was cancelled, with low Earth orbit operations transferred to the Commercial Crew Development program, which itself would not begin crewed launches until Crew Dragon Demo-2 in 2020.

Development of mission plans
In October 2006 NASA released a draft schedule of all planned NASA Constellation missions through 2019. This document included descriptions of a series of proposed vehicle test missions. In July 2007 the schedule was reviewed. In January 2008 the schedule was again reviewed. The most recent published set of milestones is from February 2009. Also, an independent assessment by the Review of United States Human Space Flight Plans Committee in October 2009 found that under NASA's then-current plans and budget the Ares I would not be ready to launch until 2017–2019, with the Ares V not available until the late 2020s.

On October 11, 2010, the Constellation program was cancelled, ending development of the Altair, Ares I, and Ares V. The Orion Crew Exploration Vehicle was renamed the Orion Multi-Purpose Crew Vehicle (MPCV), to be launched on the Space Launch System.

Constellation missions
After cancellation, one of the original launches took place anyway. Several more missions similar to Constellation missions would launch under the Orion test program and the following up Artemis program.

Abort tests
These were planned to test the launch escape system of the Orion spacecraft on the launchpad.

Successor missions
Several missions with modified profiles similar to the planned missions were launched after the conclusion of the Constellation program.

References

External links
 Official Orion NASA Web Site
 Official Ares Web Site

Missions
 
Lists of space missions

cs:Orion 12